Teruichi (written:  or  is a masculine Japanese given name. Notable people with the name include:

, Japanese shogi player
, Japanese gymnast

Japanese masculine given names